Cseszneky is a surname of Hungarian origin.

Notable people

 Benedek Cseszneky, office holder, diplomat
 György Cseszneky, castellan of Tata and Győr
 Gyula Cseszneky (1914-ca 1970) poet, translator, Macedonian Voivode
 Imre Cseszneky, agriculturalist, horse breeder
 Jakab Cseszneky, royal swordbearer, lord of Trencsén Castle, builder of Csesznek Castle 
 János Cseszneky, infantry commander, castellan of Győr
 Mátyás Cseszneky, cavalry commander
 Mihály Cseszneky, vice-castellan of Várpalota
 Mihály Cseszneky de Milvány (1910–1975), industrialist

See also
 Csesznek

Surnames